Muskrat River may refer to:

 Muskrat River (Grand lac Saint François), a tributary of Grand lac Saint François, in Les Appalaches Regional County Municipality, Chaudière-Appalaches, Quebec, Canada
 Petite rivière Muskrat, a tributary of Grand lac Saint François in Les Appalaches Regional County Municipality, Chaudière-Appalaches, Quebec, Canada
 Muskrat River (Ontario), a stream in Renfrew County, Ontario, Canada

See also
 Muskrat Creek, a tributary of the Seneca River in New York, United States